Indonesian National Route 4 is a road stretching from Cikampek to Padalarang. It was more frequently used before the Cipularang Toll Road was built. It connects Cikampek and Padalarang.

Route
Cikampek - Cikopo - Sadang - Purwakarta - Plered - Cikalongwetan - Padalarang

References

Indonesian National Routes
Transport in West Java